Mark Kratzmann and Jason Stoltenberg were the defending champions, but did not participate this year.

Omar Camporese and Goran Ivanišević won the title, defeating Nick Brown and Andrew Castle 6–4, 6–3 in the final.

Seeds

  Gary Muller /  Jim Pugh (first round)
  Jeremy Bates /  Laurie Warder (semifinals)
  Kelly Jones /  Jorge Lozano (first round)
  Omar Camporese /  Goran Ivanišević (champions)

Draw

Draw

External links
 Draw

Manchester Open
Manchester Open – Doubles
Manchester Open – Doubles
Doubles